José Luis Chea Urruela is a Guatemalan politician. He served as Guatemala's minister of Culture and Sports until November 2018.

Chea Urruela graduated from the Xavier Lyceum in Guatemala City in 1971. He subsequently earned a law degree from the Rafael Landívar University in 1978 and a master of international relations from Georgetown University in 1981. He was the Productivity and Work Party candidate in the 2019 Guatemalan general election.

References

Living people
Government ministers of Guatemala
Year of birth missing (living people)